Gandab-e Vosta (also Romanized as Gandāb-e Vosţá; also known as Gandāb, Gonbad Āb, and Gunāb) is a village in Sharwineh Rural District, Kalashi District, Javanrud County, Kermanshah Province, Iran. At the 2006 census, its population was 275, in 60 families.

References 

Populated places in Javanrud County